Art For Obama: Designing Manifest Hope and the Campaign for Change is a 2009 art book dedicated to the United States presidency of Barack Obama.

The book is edited by artist Shepard Fairey.

References

External links
Google Books

2009 non-fiction books
Books about Barack Obama
Presidency of Barack Obama
Works by Shepard Fairey
2009 in art